The Logol are a sub-ethnic group of the Nuba peoples in the Nuba Mountains of South Kordofan state, in southern Sudan. Its population is estimated to be under 10,000.

They speak the Logol language of the Kordofanian languages group, in the major Niger–Congo language family.

See also
Index: Nuba peoples

References
Joshua Project

Nuba peoples
Ethnic groups in Sudan